Cherantha De Silva (born 12 July 1996) is a Sri Lankan medal-winning swimmer, who has represented his country at 5 FINA World Championship's, 3 FINA World Cup's, 2 Commonwealth Games, 1 Asian Games as well as 1 South Asian Games, winning 7 medals.
De Silva holds 6 national records (50m,100m and 200m and butterfly SCM & LCM).
As well he was qualified with 4 World championship B standards(B cuts) for the 2018, 14th FINA World Swimming Championships (25 m) held in Hangzhou, China. He narrowly missed the A standard (A cut) in the 50m Butterfly (SCM) clocking 23.48. While the A standard could have made history for Sri Lanka as the first Sri Lankan to achieve the A standard he missed it by 0.2 seconds.

De Silva was bestowed the "Best Sportsman of the Year" award at the school level, provincial and national level.

Filmography
De Silva had the honour to be a part of the so-called world's first swimmer's movie. Named "Lane zero-The Lane of Dreams" showcases his and his team member's preparation towards the 2016 Rio Olympics.
The director of this award-winning documentary named Manuel Tera describes the documentary like this "A feature-length documentary about the struggle of a group of swimmers from developing nations trying to qualify for the Olympic Games for the first time. A story about pursuing your dreams and overcoming adversity."
The Documentary has been nominated at the sports film festival in Italy and it was able to secure an award for "The Best Sound". At present, the documentary has been sold to North and South America as well as a few countries in Europe.

Storyline
A group of swimmers from developing nations train hard at a state of the art sports centre in Thailand. Working for the first time with proper facilities and under the guidance of a world-class coach, they are making amazing progress and improving on their personal best each time. They have one year left in order to qualify for the Olympics. For most of them, it would be the first time somebody from their country gets through on their own merit. In a country full of inaccessible swimming pools, Shajan and Sajina are two Maldivian sisters who train in the sea. Nepalese Sofia can only swim during the summertime because there are no heated pools in the Himalayas. Eroi is a Rwandese boy who trains in a lake watching Internet videos. These are just some of the characters of Lane 0, a story about those unknown athletes who race in the side lanes and always finish last. Now they are immersed in an experience that will change their lives forever.

Cast
Credited cast, sorted by IMDb STARmeter:
Aisath Sajina	...	Herself
Eroi Maniraguha	...	Himself
Miguel López Alvarado	...Himself
Ayman Kelzieh	... Himself
Cheran De Silva	 ... Himself
Sajan Prakash	... Himself
Sofia Gadegaard	... Herself
Kimiko Raheem	... Herself
Aminath Shajan	... Herself
David Escolar	... Himself

Career

FINA World Championships

2013 4th FINA World Junior Swimming Championships-Dubai
De Silva participated in 2 events 50m Freestyle clocking 24.32 and 100 Butterfly clocking 57.79.

2014 FINA World Swimming Championships (25 m)-Doha
De Silva subsequently competed in the 2014 FINA World Swimming Championships held in Doha, Qatar, where he swam in the heats of the Open 50m butterfly, Open 100m butterfly, Open 50m freestyle and Open 100m freestyle.

2015 16th FINA World Championships-Kazan
De Silva participated in the 2 men 2 women mixed relay team.

2017 17th FINA World Championships-Budapest
Been able to compete in the 50m Butterfly as well as the 100m Butterfly event he was able to secure a world ranking of 49 and 55 with a time of 25.15 and 55.09 respectively.

2018 14th FINA World Swimming Championships (25 m)- Hangzhou
"Of the two men and two women swim team, Cherantha De Silva, Thimali Bandara and Savindi Jayaweera took the pool on the opening two days of the championship but had to hit the hay when they failed to advance to the semifinals amidst fierce competition."

2014 Commonwealth Games- Glassgow
De Silva participated at 2014 Commonwealth Games in Glasgow, competing in the 50m and 100m freestyle and the 50m and 100m butterfly but failed to progress past the heats.

2016 South Asian Games - Guwahati
In 2016 De Silva participated at the South Asian Games in Guwahati, India where he won one gold, four silver and two bronze medals.

2017 7th National Short Course Swimming Championship- Singapore 
In December 2017, De Silva was able to set history for Sri Lanka by breaking a foreign national record. De Silva was able to shatter Singapore Olympian Quah Wen Zeng's 50-m butterfly record, thus renewing it to 23.48 seconds. (He broke the Singapore national record and Sri Lankan national record, as well as set a new meet record in this race.) The speciality of De Silva's performance was that he was able to break 11 records across 10 events(heats and finals) in just two days. (record summary: Combination of heats, finals and a meet record.)

2018 Commonwealth Games- GoldCoast
In February 2018, de Silva was named to Sri Lanka's 2018 Commonwealth Games team. This was his 2nd representation of the Commonwealth Games edition.
Cherantha was part of 4 × 100 m freestyle relay team that made history for Sri Lanka by advancing in to the finals. "The 4-man swim team representation in the Gold Coast, powered their way through to the final of the Men’s 4x100m Freestyle event earlier this morning."
However, the team had met with an unexpected incident of disqualification which resulted in a great upset by the 4-man team.

2018 Asian Games
Following the success of the 2018 Commonwealth Games, De Silva was selected for the 2018 Asian Games which was held in August.

Scholarships

Sri Lanka government scholarship
In 2014 the former Sports Minister Mahindananda Aluthgamage sponsored de Silva to train at the Bolles School, Jacksonville, Florida.

FINA/Thanyapura scholarship

De Silva was selected in 2015 by the Sri Lanka Aquatic Sports Union (SLASU) to receive the country's first FINA affiliated international training scholarship to train at the Thanyapura Aquatic Training Centre in Phuket, Thailand. 
His scholarship has been renewed for the next 4 years consecutively; in order 2015,2016,2017 and 2018. He was bestowed with the scholarships selected as the most deserving swimmer selected by the Sri Lanka Aquatic Sports Union(SLASU).

Achievements

Sri Lanka National Records

References

External links

1996 births
Living people
Swimmers from Colombo
Sri Lankan male swimmers
Commonwealth Games competitors for Sri Lanka
Swimmers at the 2014 Commonwealth Games
Swimmers at the 2018 Commonwealth Games
Swimmers at the 2018 Asian Games
South Asian Games gold medalists for Sri Lanka
South Asian Games silver medalists for Sri Lanka
South Asian Games bronze medalists for Sri Lanka
Asian Games competitors for Sri Lanka
South Asian Games medalists in swimming